Po2, pO2, or PO2 may refer to:

 A military rank:
 Petty Officer 2nd Class in the Canadian military
 Petty Officer Second Class in the United States military
 Polikarpov Po-2 or U-2, a Soviet aeroplane
 Partial pressure of Oxygen, that is, amount of oxygen in the blood  (normally referred to as Dissolved Oxygen)
 : Phosphorus dioxide, a gaseous free radical that plays a role in the chemiluminescence of phosphorus and phosphine.
 a power of two in mathematics